Hans Heinrich XV von Hochberg (23 April 1861 – 31 January 1938) was Prince of Pless (Pszczyna), Count von Hochberg and Baron of Fürstenstein (Książ). He was the husband (1891–1923) of Mary Theresa Olivia Hochberg von Pless, also known as Princess Daisy.

A member of one of the wealthiest European noble families, he was the owner of large estates and coal mines in Silesia (Poland) which brought him enormous fortune and his extravagant lifestyle coupled with disastrous events and political and family scandals were tasty morsels for the international press.

The historical drama Magnat (1987) was based on the life of Hans Heinrich between both World Wars. The film eventually became one of the most celebrated in Polish cinematic history.

Biography

Early life

He was born on 23 April 1861, in Pless, now known as Pszczyna in Poland. He was the son of Hans Heinrich XI and Maria von Kleist. In 1879 he graduated from the exclusive St. Mary Magdalene high school in Breslau. He then studied economics at the universities of Berlin, Geneva and Bonn. Later the studies prepared him to manage the wealth of the Hochberg family in Silesia. At the age of 22 Hans Heinrich XV, the son of a duke (Herzog von Pless) received from Emperor Wilhelm I a lower princely title and officially became the Fürst von Pless (Prince of Pless). In the years 1881–1882 he served in the German Imperial Army, first as a volunteer in the Royal Hussar regiment and later the Guard Hussars. After two years he left the army as a lieutenant. Between 1882 and 1885 he participated in a long, eventful hunting trip around the world and visited, among others, India and North America. After his return, he joined the Ministry of Foreign Affairs in Berlin, Germany. There he met and became friends with the young heir to the throne William Hohenzollern (later Emperor Wilhelm II). In 1886, Hans Heinrich XV was moved to a diplomatic post in Brussels, and a year later he became an attaché at the embassy in Paris.

Career and First Marriage

In 1890, Hans Heinrich XV was awarded the position of secretary at the German embassy in London. There he met and proposed to the younger Mary Theresa Olivia Cornwallis-West called Daisy. Since the Cornwallis-West family was impoverished, the Hochbergs were forced to pay and organise the wedding. The wedding ceremony took place at St. Margaret's in Westminster on 8 December 1891. Notable witnesses were Edward, Prince of Wales (later King Edward VII) and his wife Princess Alexandra, while Queen Victoria personally gave the couple her blessing. They began their married life by traveling throughout Europe, Africa, Asia and America. As a wedding gift from Hans Heinrich XI, the senior head of the house, the young couple received Schloss Fürstenstein near Waldenburg , where they hosted the finest European aristocracy throughout their entire marriage. The couple had four children:

Daughter (25 February 1893 – 11 March 1893).
Hans Heinrich XVII William Albert Edward (2 February 1900 – 26 January 1984),4th Prince of Pless, Count von Hochberg and Baron of Fürstenstein. Married twice but had no issue.
Alexander Frederick William George Conrad Ernest Maximilian (1 February 1905 – 22 February 1984),5th Prince of Pless, Count von Hochberg and Baron of Fürstenstein. Unmarried and childless.
Bolko Conrad Frederick (23 September 1910 – 22 June 1936), married his stepmother (the second wife of his father) Clotilde de Silva y González de Candamo (19 July 1898 – 12 December 1978) and caused a scandal. They had four children (including Bolko, 6th Prince).

Since 1902 Hans Heinrich XV, as one of the representatives of the Prussian House of Lords, was a supporter of the Free Conservative Party (Freikonserwative Vereinigung) that represented and supported the interests of wealthy and influential landowners. At the provincial level Hans Heinrich XV served as Vice President of the Silesian province (1897–1918) and also participated in the work of the Silesian provincial parliament. Additionally, he was the chairman of the Pless Regional Council (Kreistag). In November 1902 he travelled to the United States as a diplomatic representative of Kaiser Wilhelm II and took part in the inauguration of the German Chamber of Commerce, visited several industrial plants (including the one in Pennsylvania), and the highlight of the trip was a visit to the White House and a conversation with President Theodore Roosevelt.

Prince of Pless and Second Marriage

After his father's death in 1907, Hans Heinrich XV became the Prince of Pless and the owner of the largest estates in the German Empire – In Pless (Pszczyna) (approx. 40 thousand hectares of land, 6 coal mines, a brewery in Tychy and others) and in Waldenburg (Wałbrzych) (approx. 10 thousand hectares and 3 coal mines). These assets systematically decreased due to debt caused by the profligate lifestyle of the family and huge architectural investments (including the reconstruction of the Książ Castle). However between 1914 and 1924 he made many industrial investments in the Upper and Lower Silesia (expansion of mines). He financially supported the German nationalist organisations (e.g. Deutscher Flottenverein), however, opposed the activities Ostmarkenverein in his Upper Silesian estates. During World War I he was promoted to the rank of a colonel and served as an officer. In the years 1915–1917 he lent his castle in Pless to the German Army. After the war all of his estates in Pless became Polish and the city was renamed to Pszczyna.

In 1922 he received Polish citizenship. In order to win the favour of the Polish authorities he often relied on his Piast roots and hosted the representatives of the Polish political establishment in his castles. On 22 October of that year he divorced Princess Daisy.

On 25 January 1925 in London he married secondly Clotilde de Silva y González de Candamo (19 July 1898  – 12 December 1978), a Spanish noblewoman and daughter of the 10th Marquis de Arcicóllar, then Spanish Ambassador to the Court of Saint James. They had two children:
Beatrice Maria Luise Margaret (15 July 1929 – 10 October 2021). Married twice and has issue.
Conrad Joseph Hans (12 June 1930 – 29 November 1934).

This marriage also ended in a divorce in 1934 because of the family scandal – the seduction of the youngest son of Hans Heinrich XV – Bolko – by his stepmother. They subsequently married and had two children, Hedwig Maria and Bolko Constantine.

As a result of the global economic crisis, the Lower Silesian estates belonging to the Hochbergs fell into debt. In 1936, against the pressures of creditors Hans Heinrich XV left Waldenburg (now Książ) and came to Pszczyna, where his son Hans Heinrich XVII fought tax disputes with the Polish authorities, which became the heading of international media. Finally Hans Heinrich himself led to the end of the crisis by signing in 1937 an agreement in which the Hochbergs lost the privilege of mining in Pszczyna and lost control over the tax system.
Eventually the Polish state took over 56% of his assets.

Last years
He died of a heart attack on 31 January 1938 in the Ritz Hotel in Paris and was buried in Pszczyna. During World War II his surviving sons both fought against the Nazis, Hans Heinrich XVII as John Henry Pless in the British RAF and Alexander Hochberg under the name of Aleksander Pszczyński as the shooter in the Polish Army under the command of General Władysław Anders.

Film adaptations
Magnat (1987) – Hans Heinrich XV portrayed by Polish actor Jan Nowicki.

Orders and decorations 
  Kingdom of Prussia:
 Knight of the Order of the Red Eagle, 1st Class
 Knight of the Royal Order of the Crown, 1st Class
 : Grand Cross of the Merit Order of Philip the Magnanimous, 1 October 1898
 : Grand Cross of the Order of the Griffon
   Austria-Hungary: Knight of the Imperial Order of the Iron Crown, 1st Class
 : Order of the Medjidie, 2nd Class

Notes

References and bibliography

External links
 

1861 births
1938 deaths
German landowners
Silesian nobility
People from Pszczyna
People from Wałbrzych
Members of the Prussian House of Lords
Recipients of the Order of the Medjidie, 2nd class